Olcay Şahan (born 26 May 1987) is a Turkish professional footballer who plays as a winger or as an attacking midfielder for Afjet Afyonspor. Born in Germany, he represented the Turkey national team internationally.

Club career

Germany
In 2008, Şahan played his first professional match against Alemannia Aachen with MSV Duisburg shirt. For the following seasons he started to play more frequently. In the 2010–11 season, from the beginning he became the number one choice for his coach Milan Šašić. After a successful season he was transferred to 1. FC Kaiserslautern. With his new team he started to play at Bundesliga level and inspired Fritz-Walter-Stadion guests very quickly in a short time.

Beşiktaş
Before the 2012–13 season he was transferred to Turkish side Beşiktaş, for an €800,000 fee on a four-year contract. From the beginning of the season, coach Samet Aybaba placed him on the first eleven in every game of the season. On 22 October 2012, Şahan scored his first league goal against Gaziantepspor. He finished the season with 11 goals and eight assists. With his successful first season at the club, he became one of the favorite players in the eyes of Beşiktaş fans.

Trabzonspor
On 12 January 2017, Şahan joined Trabzonspor.

International career
Şahan was born in Germany to parents of Turkish descent and played for the German U-17s, before switching to the Turkish federation. His performances during the 2012–13 season earned him a call-up to the Turkey national team managed by Abdullah Avcı. On 22 March 2013, Şahan played his first international match against Andorra. Manager Fatih Terim selected Şahan for Turkey 2014 World Cup UEFA Group D qualifying matches. He was a member of the Turkish national team squad for Euro 2016.

Style of play
Şahan plays as an attacking midfielder, generally as a left winger in Turkish Super League. At the international level he was used as a "playmaker" by Fatih Terim. He is known for his quickness, pace and hardworking forms.

Career statistics

Club

International goals
Scores and results list Turkey's goal tally first, score column indicates score after each Şahan goal.

Honours
Beşiktaş
Süper Lig: 2015–16

References

External links
 Official Website
 
 
 
 

1987 births
Living people
Footballers from Düsseldorf
Citizens of Turkey through descent
Turkish footballers
German footballers
Association football midfielders
Turkey international footballers
Turkey B international footballers
Germany youth international footballers
UEFA Euro 2016 players
German people of Turkish descent
Bundesliga players
2. Bundesliga players
Süper Lig players
TFF Second League players
Bayer 04 Leverkusen players
Fortuna Düsseldorf players
Borussia Mönchengladbach players
MSV Duisburg players
1. FC Kaiserslautern players
Beşiktaş J.K. footballers
Trabzonspor footballers
Denizlispor footballers
Yeni Malatyaspor footballers